Traian Nițescu (11 October 1902 – 19 April 1984) was a Romanian engineer. He competed in the bobsleigh four-man event at the 1928 Winter Olympics.

References

1902 births
1984 deaths
Canadian mining engineers
Romanian emigrants to Canada
Romanian male bobsledders
Romanian mining engineers
Olympic bobsledders of Romania
Bobsledders at the 1928 Winter Olympics
Sportspeople from Craiova